Hendrik Ochel (born 26 February 1969) is a German male handball player. He was a member of the Germany men's national handball team. He was part of the  team at the 1992 Summer Olympics. On club level he played for TSV Milbertshofen in München.

References

1969 births
Living people
German male handball players
Handball players at the 1992 Summer Olympics
Olympic handball players of Germany
Sportspeople from Kiel